Eastridge Mall can refer to one of the following shopping malls:

Eastridge, a mall in San Jose, California
Eastridge Mall (Gastonia) a mall in Gastonia, North Carolina formerly known (2002-2013) as Westfield Eastridge
Eastridge Mall (Casper), a mall in Casper, Wyoming